Dixie is an unincorporated community in Elmore County, Idaho, United States.

History
Dixie's population was 25 in 1909.

References

Unincorporated communities in Elmore County, Idaho
Unincorporated communities in Idaho